African Studies Abstracts Online (ASAO) was a quarterly abstracting service covering academic journal articles and edited works on Africa in the field of the social sciences and the humanities. It was published by the Afrika-Studiecentrum Leiden. The journal was established in 1968 as Documentatieblad and renamed African Studies Abstracts in 1994, before obtaining its current name in 2002 when print was abandoned and with volume numbering re-starting at 1. ASAO no. 60 (2017) was the last issue.

References

External links

Publications established in 1968
Bibliographic databases and indexes
African studies journals
Multilingual journals
Dutch-language journals
English-language journals
French-language journals
German-language journals